Cassina Gambrel Was Missing is a 1999 novel by William Watkins.

Plot 
Set against turbulent events in Memphis, Tennessee in the late 1970s, the novel concerns a young, white, college student named Jackson Taylor who  befriends an older black woman named Cassina Gambrel.  As the protagonist's fortune and world expands, Cassina's narrows.  Years later, Jackson begins a search for his former friend and the book takes on a cynical tone, bordering on bitterness, while the story unfolds through a series of revealing flashbacks.

Reception and characteristics 
The novel has been described as part coming-of-age story and part comedy of manners and garnered praise for the author's ability to draw keen characterizations with few words and to juggle a non-linear narrative with skill.

References

1999 American novels
Novels set in Memphis, Tennessee
Nonlinear narrative novels